The 1880 Vermont gubernatorial election took place on September 7, 1880. Incumbent Republican Redfield Proctor, per the "Mountain Rule", did not run for re-election to a second term as Governor of Vermont. Republican candidate Roswell Farnham defeated Democratic candidate Edward J. Phelps to succeed him.

Results

References

Vermont
1880
Gubernatorial
September 1880 events